Saif Hussain Al-Qeshtah (born 28 January 1993) is a Saudi Arabian professional footballer who plays as a centre back for Al-Riyadh.

Career
Al-Qeshtah is an academy graduate of Wej and was promoted to the first team at the start of the 2014–15 season. He signed his first professional contract with Wej on 22 July 2016. Following Wej's relegation to the Second Division, Al-Qeshtah joined Al-Hazem. He played an important in Al-Hazem's promotion to the Pro League. On 14 July 2018, Al-Qeshtah renewed his contract with Al-Hazem for a further two years. On 8 October 2020, Al-Qeshtah joined Al-Ain on a free transfer following Al-Hazem's relegation. On 4 August 2022, Al-Qeshtah joined Al-Riyadh on a free transfer.

References

External links
 

1993 births
Living people
People from Taif
Saudi Arabian footballers
Association football defenders
Saudi Second Division players
Saudi First Division League players
Saudi Professional League players
Wej SC players
Al-Hazem F.C. players
Al-Ain FC (Saudi Arabia) players
Al-Riyadh SC players
Saudi Arabia youth international footballers